Jesse Leigh is an American actor. They are known for portraying Bobbie Yang on the Peacock sitcom Rutherford Falls.

Early life 
Leigh was born in Woodland Hills, in Los Angeles, California.

They attended Orange County School of the Arts for high school.

Leigh graduated in 2020 as a Communication studies major at University of California, Los Angeles.

Career 
In 2018, they had a role on the Paramount Network series Heathers. They also appeared on the shows Foursome, Superstore, and Henry Danger.

In August 2020 it was announced Leigh was joining the main cast of the sitcom Rutherford Falls, starring Ed Helms. When Leigh auditioned for Rutherford Falls, the character of Bobbie was intended to be masculine, but was rewritten as nonbinary for Leigh.

In an early review of Rutherford Falls for the web-site Decider, critic Joel Keller called Leigh the show's "sleeper star," writing, "Every time Jesse Leigh opens up their mouth as Bobbie, something funny comes out. We hope to see more of them during the first season."

Personal life
Leigh identifies as nonbinary and goes by plural third-person pronouns.

Filmography

Television

References

External links 
 

Actors from California
American non-binary actors
LGBT people from California
Year of birth missing (living people)
Living people